The River Rat is a 1984 independent family film directed by Thomas Rickman and starring Tommy Lee Jones and Martha Plimpton. It was filmed on location in Hickman, Kentucky, on the banks of the Mississippi River.

Plot

Jonsy is a teenager who meets her father Billy, who has just been released from prison, for the first time. The two slowly forge a relationship as they rebuild a boat named The River Rat.  The father cannot escape his criminal past, being blackmailed by the prison psychiatrist Doc Cole, who believes he knows the location of a large amount of cash stolen before imprisonment.

Father and daughter ride The River Rat on a picturesque trip down the Mississippi River to Memphis, Tennessee in an effort to find the money and elude the prison doctor.  Along the way, they learn about each other and grow closer.

Cast
 Martha Plimpton as Jonsy
 Tommy Lee Jones as Billy
 Brian Dennehy as "Doc" Cole
 Shawn Smith as Wexel

Production

The film was written and directed by Thomas Rickman, who was nominated for an Academy Award in 1980 for his screenplay of Coal Miner's Daughter, also starring Tommy Lee Jones. The film was produced by Bob Larson (executive producer of Coal Miner's Daughter) and Michael Apted (who directed Coal Miner's Daughter) served as executive producer.  The film was a Larson/Rickman Production in association with the Sundance Institute. The original music was composed by Mike Post.

References

External links 
 
 
 

1984 films
1984 crime drama films
1984 independent films
Films set in the United States
Films shot in Kentucky
Paramount Pictures films
American crime drama films
Films about father–daughter relationships
1980s English-language films
1980s American films
Fulton County, Kentucky